Yakob Hashim is a former Singaporean football goalkeeper who played for Singapore in the 1984 Asian Cup. He also played for Police SA.

After retirement from his playing career, Yakob became the coach of Singapore National Football League Division 1 club Yishun Sentek Mariners FC.

In 2017, Yakob was elected to the Football Association of Singapore council.

References

Stats

Living people
Singaporean footballers
Singapore international footballers
1984 AFC Asian Cup players
Home United FC players
Association football goalkeepers
1960 births